Voxbone S.A. is a global communication as a service (CaaS) company that is a wholly owned subsidiary of Bandwidth, Inc., with offices in locations including Brussels, London, San Francisco, Austin, Simi Valley, Dublin, Singapore and Iași. Voxbone became a part of Bandwidth on November 2, 2020.

Voxbone enables telephony applications such as conferencing platforms and call centers to send and receive phone calls, text messages and faxes in 60+ countries making up 93% of global GDP, with the company’s services accessed through a web platform or REST API. Voxbone's services are delivered over a private IP network that interconnects with local phone networks in the countries where it operates.
 
Voxbone customers include Uber, Zoom, Skype, Dialpad, 8x8, Deutsche Telekom, Telefonica, NTT, Level(3) and Orange.

History

Voxbone was founded in Brussels, Belgium, in 2005 by Rodrigue Ullens and Francois Struman as Voxbone SA/NV. As a consultant for telecom operators, Ullens noticed the growing demand for phone numbers from other countries and decided to create the business. The founders’ mission was to offer simplified access to telephony resources through the cloud.

In 2011, the company launched a “global capacity-sharing model” to tackle the complex tasks and costs associated with planning and managing global voice traffic. Customers are charged according to their peak simultaneous sessions globally (vs. total minute usage per country, or geographical origin of calls, in traditional models).

In August 2015 Vitruvian Partners LLP (“Vitruvian”), a leading independent European private equity firm, announced that it had acquired a majority stake in Voxbone SA.

In March 2019 Voxbone announced the launch of its enterprise platform. Built for business end users, the platform provides voice and messaging in 65 countries.

On October 12, 2020 Voxbone announced its acquisition by Bandwidth for €446 million EUR. On November 2, 2020, it was announced that the deal had been finalized.

Services

Voxbone provides two-way voice and messaging services from the cloud for businesses including local, national, mobile and toll-free phone numbers (commonly known as direct inward dialing numbers), which telecommunication providers and/or enterprises use to extend the reach of their voice networks to international locations, without requiring a local office, network or license for each country. Voxbone also supports local number portability and offers the ability to port existing local telephone numbers from other local service providers to its network.

Voxbone Voice - A single-source alternative to legacy carriers and SIP providers, providing 2-way voice including domestic dialing capabilities, local number portability and access to Emergency Services
Voxbone Mobile - Two-way messaging and voice on SIM-free mobile numbers.
Voxbone Connect - 500+ interconnection paths into the Voxbone global voice network spread around the world
Voxbone Insights - Call quality performance metrics in real-time across the network and customer legs of the call journey for an end-to-end view on Mean Opinion Score, Jitter, Packet Loss, Round Trip Time and more.

Use Cases
Voxbone DID numbers and SIP trunks can play a role in different types of applications:
  
Contact Centers: Contact centers have the ability to provide toll-free and local call routes to their customers. Voxbone's numbers can be integrated into contact center platforms to extend their reach into new international markets. Examples of such companies include NICE inContact and  LiveOps.
Conferencing providers: Voxbone's phone numbers offer end-users the ability to dial into a conferencing bridge from any country. Examples of such companies include: Arkadin, Zoom, Speek, LoopUp.
Business telephony: Voxbone provides businesses with voice and messaging infrastructure upon which they can build their own communications applications or run UCaaS and CPaaS solutions. They also offer access to emergency services and localized domestic calling capabilities.
Cloud PBX and SIP trunking companies: Local telephone numbers from Voxbone make IP-based voice and unified communications (UC) services reachable from local PSTN networks in many countries. Examples of such companies include: 8x8 Inc. and Fuze.
 International Calling Companies: Low-cost international calling rates use Voxbone's services to provide local dial-in numbers to customers. Such companies include: Skype and IDT.
 Telecom API Companies: Developers can integrate into their own applications. Examples of such companies include: Deutsche Telekom's Developer Garden and Aculab.

References

Companies established in 2003
Telecommunications companies of Belgium
VoIP companies